Annwn, Annwfn, or Annwfyn (in Middle Welsh,  Annwvn, Annwyn, Annwyfn, Annwvyn, or Annwfyn) is the Otherworld in Welsh mythology. Ruled by Arawn (or, in Arthurian literature, by Gwyn ap Nudd), it was essentially a world of delights and eternal youth where disease was absent and food was ever-abundant. 
It became identified with the Christian afterlife in paradise (or heaven).

Name and etymology
Middle Welsh sources suggest that the term was recognised as meaning "very deep" in medieval times. The appearance of a form antumnos on an ancient Gaulish curse tablet, which means an ('other') + tumnos ('world'), however, suggests that the original term may have been *ande-dubnos, a common Gallo-Brittonic word that literally meant "underworld".

Mythical locations
In both Welsh and Irish mythologies, the Otherworld was believed to be located either on an island or underneath the earth. In the First Branch of the Mabinogi, it is implied that Annwn is a land within Dyfed, while the context of the Arthurian poem Preiddeu Annwfn suggests an island location. Two other otherworldly feasts that occur in the Second Branch of the Mabinogi are located in Harlech in northwest Wales and on Ynys Gwales in southwest Pembrokeshire.

Appearances in Welsh literature
Annwn plays a reasonably prominent role in the Four Branches of the Mabinogi, a set of four interlinked mythological tales dating from the early medieval period. In the First Branch of the Mabinogi, entitled Pwyll, Prince of Dyfed, the eponymous prince offends Arawn, ruler of Annwn, by baiting his hunting hounds on a stag that Arawn's dogs had brought down. In recompense he exchanges places with Arawn for a year and defeats Arawn's enemy Hafgan, while Arawn rules in his stead in Dyfed. During this year, Pwyll abstains from sleeping with Arawn's wife, earning himself gratitude and eternal friendship from Arawn. On his return, Pwyll becomes known by the title Penn Annwn, "Head (or Ruler) of Annwn." In the Fourth Branch, Arawn is mentioned but does not appear; it is revealed that he sent a gift of otherworldly pigs to Pwyll's son and successor, Pryderi, which ultimately leads to war between Dyfed and Gwynedd.

The similarly mythological epic poem Cad Goddeu describes a battle between Gwynedd and the forces of Annwn, led again by Arawn. It is revealed that Amaethon, nephew to Math, king of Gwynedd, stole a bitch, a lapwing and a roebuck from the Otherworld, leading to a war between the two peoples. The denizens of Annwn are depicted as bizarre and hellish creatures; these include a "wide-mawed" beast with a hundred heads and bearing a host beneath the root of its tongue and another under its neck, a hundred-clawed black-groined toad, and a "mottled ridged serpent, with a thousand souls, by their sins, tortured in the holds of its flesh". Gwydion, the Venedotian hero and magician successfully defeats Arawn's army, first by enchanting the trees to rise up and fight and then by guessing the name of the enemy hero Bran, thus winning the battle.

Preiddeu Annwfn, an early medieval poem found in the Book of Taliesin, describes a voyage led by King Arthur to the numerous otherworldy kingdoms within Annwn, either to rescue the prisoner Gweir or to retrieve the cauldron of the Head of Annwn. The narrator of the poem is possibly intended to be Taliesin himself. One line can be interpreted as implying that he received his gift of poetry or speech from a magic cauldron, as Taliesin does in other texts, and Taliesin's name is connected to a similar story in another work. The speaker relates how he journeyed with Arthur and three boatloads of men into Annwfn, but only seven returned. Annwfn is apparently referred to by several names, including "Mound Fortress," "Four-Peaked Fortress," and "Glass Fortress", though it is possible the poet intended these to be distinct places. Within the Mound Fort's walls Gweir, one of the "Three Exalted Prisoners of Britain" known from the Welsh Triads, is imprisoned in chains. The narrator then describes the cauldron of the Chief of Annwn: it is finished with pearl and will not boil a coward's food. Whatever tragedy ultimately killed all but seven of them is not clearly explained. The poem continues with an excoriation of "little men" and monks, who lack various forms of knowledge possessed by the poet.

Over time, the role of king of Annwn was transferred to Gwyn ap Nudd, a hunter and psychopomp, who may have been the Welsh personification of winter. The Christian Vita Collen tells of Saint Collen vanquishing Gwyn and his otherworldly court from Glastonbury Tor with the use of holy water.  In Culhwch and Olwen, an early Welsh Arthurian tale, it is said that God gave Gwyn ap Nudd control over the demons lest "this world be destroyed." Tradition revolves around Gwyn leading his spectral hunts, the Cŵn Annwn ("Hounds of Annwn"), on his hunt for mortal souls. Angelika Rüdiger's Doctoral Thesis, 'Y Tylwyth Teg: an analysis of a literary motif' (Bangor University, 2021) is a detailed study of supernatural characters connected with Annwn (including Gwyn ap Nudd), covering a period from the earliest sources to the 19th and 20th centuries.

Annwn in modern culture

J. R. R. Tolkien used the word "annún" in his "Middle-Earth" mythology as a term in the elvish language Sindarin (phonologically inspired by Welsh) meaning "west" or "sunset" (corresponding to the Quenya "Andúnë"), often referring figuratively to the "True West", i.e. the blessed land of Aman beyond the Sea, the Lonely Island "Tol Eressëa", or, (in the later mannish usage) to the drowned island of Númenor. This is an example of Tolkien's method of world-building, by "explaining the true meaning" of various real-world words by assigning them an alternative "elvish" etymology.

The Anglo-Welsh author, poet, critic and playwright, David Jones Annwn (born 1953) adopted the name Annwn in 1975 in the same spirit that his great-uncle, the Welsh bard , had adopted the name Ap Hefin ("Son of the Summer Solstice").

In 2004, the online game Runescape introduced a region to the game inhabited by elves called Tirannwn. The name means "Land of Annwn" in Welsh.

The Dark, a 2005 film directed by John Fawcett and based on the novel Sheep by Simon Maginn, involves the legend, though set in contemporary times.

Annwn is the name of a German medieval and pagan folk duo from North Rhine-Westphalia. The name was also previously used by an unrelated Celtic Rock trio in Berkeley, California, from 1991 until the death of lead singer Leigh Ann Hussey on 16 May 2006.

Annwn is one of the deep realms of Faerie in October Daye, a 2012 urban fantasy series written by Seanan McGuire.

The Gaulish term Antumnos and the otherworld features heavily in Swiss folk metal band Eluveitie's 2014 release Origins, specifically in the song "King".

In the 2015 British film Arthur and Merlin Arthur receives the sword Annwn as a gift from the Otherworld in order to defeat the god Hafgan.

British author Niel Bushnell's novels Sorrowline and Timesmith feature an island called Annwn in the realm of Otherworld.

Using the variant spelling Annwyn, it is an otherworldly location in the MMORPG Vindictus. Vindictus is loosely based on Celtic mythology, and known as Mabinogi: Heroes in Asia.

Annwyn, Beneath the Waves is the second album by American gothic rock/dark wave band Faith and the Muse.

Children's author Lloyd Alexander used the name "Annuvin", an Anglicized spelling of the variant Annwfyn, in his Chronicles of Prydain series. Annuvin is the domain of Arawn, who in these novels plays the role of Evil Overlord.

American avant-garde composer Mick Barr, under his pseudonym Ocrilim, released an album titled Annwn in 2008, consisting of compositions for three guitars. A sequel Annwn 2 was released in 2012 and solo-guitar versions of both albums in 2015 called Cruinn Annwn.

Australian abstract artist Estelle Asmodelle painted works entitled "Journey in Annwn" and "The Otherworld of Annwn".

One of the areas in the platform-adventure video game La-Mulana 2 is named Annwfn.

Annwn: The Otherworld is a surreal stealth/strategy game drawing on Welsh mythic motifs.

In 2021, Bearded Badger published a book by Ross Lowe, Step Forward Harry Salt, which heavily features Annwn and King Gwynn.

See also
Avalon
Caer Sidi
Tír na nÓg

Notes

Sources
Lambert, Pierre-Yves. (2003). La langue gauloise: description linguistique, commentaire d’inscriptions choisies. Paris: Errance. 2nd ed.
Sims-Williams, Patrick. (1990). "Some Celtic otherworld terms". Celtic Language, Celtic Culture: a Festschrift for Eric P. Hamp, ed. Ann T. E. Matonis and Daniel F. Mela, pp. 57–84. Van Nuys, Ca.: Ford & Bailie.
Davies, Sioned. (2007). The Mabinogion – a new translation. (Oxford World's Classics.)
Mac Cana, Proinsias. (1983). Celtic Mythology (Library of the World's Myths and Legends). Littlehampton Book Services Ltd.
Lindahl, C. A. (2000–2002). Medieval Folklore. Oxford: Oxford University Press, Inc.
Matthews, John. (1996). Sources of the Grail. Edinburgh: Floris Books .
Dixon-Kennedy, Mike. (1996). Celtic Myth & Legend. London: Blandford and Cassel Imprint .

Locations associated with Arthurian legend
Locations in Celtic mythology
Welsh mythology
Taliesin
Underworld